The 67th Academy Awards ceremony, organized by the Academy of Motion Picture Arts and Sciences (AMPAS) took place on March 27, 1995, at the Shrine Auditorium in Los Angeles beginning at 6:00 p.m. PST / 9:00 p.m. EST. During the ceremony, AMPAS presented Academy Awards (commonly referred to as the Oscars) in 23 categories honoring the films released in 1994. The ceremony, televised in the United States by ABC, was produced by Gilbert Cates and directed by Jeff Margolis. Comedian David Letterman hosted the show for the first time. Three weeks earlier in a ceremony held at the Regent Beverly Wilshire Hotel in Beverly Hills, California on March 4, the Academy Awards for Technical Achievement were presented by host Jamie Lee Curtis.

Forrest Gump won six awards, including Best Picture. Other winners included Ed Wood, The Lion King, and Speed with two awards and The Adventures of Priscilla, Queen of the Desert, Blue Sky, Bob's Birthday, Bullets Over Broadway, Burnt by the Sun, Franz Kafka's It's a Wonderful Life, Legends of the Fall, The Madness of King George, Maya Lin: A Strong Clear Vision, Pulp Fiction, A Time for Justice, and Trevor with one. The telecast garnered more than 48 million viewers in the United States, making it the most watched Oscars telecast since the 55th Academy Awards in 1983.

Winners and nominees

The nominees for the 67th Academy Awards were announced on February 14, 1995, at the Samuel Goldwyn Theater in Beverly Hills, California, by Arthur Hiller, the then-president of the Academy, and actress Angela Bassett. Forrest Gump earned the most nominations with thirteen. It was the most nominated film since 1966's Who's Afraid of Virginia Woolf? and the fifth film to earn that many nominations. Bullets Over Broadway, Pulp Fiction, and The Shawshank Redemption tied for second with seven each.

The winners were announced during the awards ceremony on March 27, 1995. For only the second time in Oscar history, three of the four acting winners were previous winners. The 11th ceremony held in 1939 previously accomplished this feat. Best Actor winner Tom Hanks became the fifth performer to win consecutive acting Oscars and the second person to do so in the aforementioned category since Spencer Tracy won for his performances in Captains Courageous (1937) and Boys Town (1938). He also was the sixth person to win Best Actor twice. Best Supporting Actress winner Dianne Wiest became the first person to win two acting Oscars for performances in films directed by the same person. She first won in that same category for her role in Woody Allen's 1986 film Hannah and Her Sisters. Franz Kafka's It's a Wonderful Life and Trevors joint win in the Best Live Action Short category marked the fifth occurrence of a tie in Oscar history; the next tie would occur at the 85th Academy Awards in 2013.

Awards

Winners are listed first, highlighted in boldface, and indicated with a double dagger.

{| class=wikitable
| valign="top" width="50%" |

 Forrest Gump – Wendy Finerman, Steve Tisch and Steve Starkey, producers Four Weddings and a Funeral – Duncan Kenworthy, producer
 Pulp Fiction – Lawrence Bender, producer
 Quiz Show – Robert Redford, Michael Jacobs, Julian Krainin, and Michael Nozik, producers
 The Shawshank Redemption – Niki Marvin, producer
| valign="top" width="50%" |

 Robert Zemeckis – Forrest Gump
 Woody Allen – Bullets Over Broadway
 Quentin Tarantino – Pulp Fiction
 Robert Redford – Quiz Show
 Krzysztof Kieślowski – Three Colours: Red
|-
| valign="top" |

 Tom Hanks – Forrest Gump as Forrest Gump
 Morgan Freeman – The Shawshank Redemption as Ellis Boyd "Red" Redding
 Nigel Hawthorne – The Madness of King George as King George III
 Paul Newman – Nobody's Fool as Donald "Sully" Sullivan
 John Travolta – Pulp Fiction as Vincent Vega
| valign="top" |

 Jessica Lange – Blue Sky as Carly Marshall
 Jodie Foster – Nell as Nell Kellty
 Miranda Richardson – Tom & Viv as Vivienne Haigh-Wood
 Winona Ryder – Little Women as Josephine "Jo" March
 Susan Sarandon – The Client as Regina "Reggie" Love
|-
| valign="top" |

 Martin Landau – Ed Wood as Bela Lugosi
 Samuel L. Jackson – Pulp Fiction as Jules Winnfield
 Chazz Palminteri – Bullets Over Broadway as Cheech
 Paul Scofield – Quiz Show as Mark Van Doren
 Gary Sinise – Forrest Gump as Lt. Dan Taylor
| valign="top" |

 Dianne Wiest – Bullets Over Broadway as Helen Sinclair
 Rosemary Harris – Tom & Viv as Rose Robinson Haigh-Wood
 Helen Mirren – The Madness of King George as Queen Charlotte
 Uma Thurman – Pulp Fiction as Mia Wallace
 Jennifer Tilly – Bullets Over Broadway as Olive Neal
|-
| valign="top" |

 Pulp Fiction – Screenplay by Quentin Tarantino; Stories by Quentin Tarantino and Roger Avary
 Bullets Over Broadway – Woody Allen and Douglas McGrath
 Four Weddings and a Funeral – Richard Curtis
 Heavenly Creatures – Peter Jackson and Frances Walsh
 Three Colours: Red – Krzysztof Kieślowski and Krzysztof Piesiewicz
| valign="top" |

 Forrest Gump – Eric Roth based on the novel by Winston Groom The Madness of King George – Alan Bennett based on his stage play The Madness of George III
 Nobody's Fool – Robert Benton based on the novel by Richard Russo
 Quiz Show – Paul Attanasio based on the book Remembering America: A Voice from the Sixties by Richard N. Goodwin
 The Shawshank Redemption – Frank Darabont based on the short novel "Rita Hayworth and Shawshank Redemption" by Stephen King
|-
| valign="top" |

 Burnt by the Sun (Russia) in Russian – Nikita Mikhalkov, director Before the Rain (FYR Macedonia) in Macedonian, Albanian, and English – Milcho Manchevski, director
 Eat Drink Man Woman (Taiwan) in Mandarin Chinese – Ang Lee, director
 Farinelli: Il Castrato (Belgium) in French and Italian – Gérard Corbiau, director
 Strawberry and Chocolate (Cuba) in Spanish – Tomás Gutiérrez Alea and Juan Carlos Tabío, directors
| valign="top" |

 Maya Lin: A Strong Clear Vision – Freida Lee Mock and Terry Sanders Complaints of a Dutiful Daughter – Deborah Hoffmann
 D-Day Remembered – Charles Guggenheim
 Freedom on My Mind – Connie Field and Marilyn Mulford
 A Great Day in Harlem – Jean Bach
|-
| valign="top" |

 A Time for Justice – Charles Guggenheim 89mm from Europe – Marcel Łoziński
 Blues Highway – Vince DiPersio and Bill Guttentag
 School of the Americas Assassins – Robert Richter
 Straight from the Heart – Dee Mosbacher and Frances Reid
| valign="top" |

 Franz Kafka's It's a Wonderful Life – Peter Capaldi and Ruth Kenley-Letts Trevor – Peggy Rajski and Randy Stone Kangaroo Court – Sean Astin and Christine Astin
 On Hope – JoBeth Williams and Michele McGuire
 Syrup – Paul Unwin and Nick Vivian
|-
| valign="top" |

 Bob's Birthday – Alison Snowden and David Fine The Big Story – Tim Watts and David Stoten
 The Janitor – Vanessa Schwartz
 The Monk and the Fish – Michaël Dudok de Wit
 Triangle – Erica Russell
| valign="top" |

 The Lion King – Hans Zimmer Forrest Gump – Alan Silvestri
 Interview with the Vampire – Elliot Goldenthal
 Little Women – Thomas Newman
 The Shawshank Redemption – Thomas Newman
|-
| valign="top" |

 "Can You Feel the Love Tonight" from The Lion King – Music by Elton John; Lyrics by Tim Rice "Circle of Life" from The Lion King – Music by Elton John; Lyrics by Tim Rice
 "Hakuna Matata" from The Lion King – Music by Elton John; Lyrics by Tim Rice
 "Look What Love Has Done" from Junior – Music and Lyrics by Carole Bayer Sager, James Newton Howard, James Ingram and Patty Smyth
 "Make Up Your Mind" from The Paper – Music and Lyrics by Randy Newman
| valign="top" |

 Speed – Stephen Hunter Flick Clear and Present Danger – Bruce Stambler and John Leveque
 Forrest Gump – Gloria Borders and Randy Thom
|-
| valign="top" |

 Speed – Gregg Landaker, Steve Maslow, Bob Beemer and David MacMillan Clear and Present Danger – Donald O. Mitchell, Michael Herbick, Frank A. Montaño and Art Rochester
 Forrest Gump – Randy Thom, Tom Johnson, Dennis S. Sands and William B. Kaplan
 Legends of the Fall – Paul Massey, David E. Campbell, Chris David and Douglas Ganton
 The Shawshank Redemption – Robert J. Litt, Elliot Tyson, Michael Herbick and Willie D. Burton
| valign="top" |

 The Madness of King George – Art Direction: Ken Adam; Set Decoration: Carolyn Scott Bullets Over Broadway – Art Direction: Santo Loquasto; Set Decoration: Susan Bode
 Forrest Gump – Art Direction: Rick Carter; Set Decoration: Nancy Haigh
 Interview with the Vampire – Art Direction: Dante Ferretti; Set Decoration: Francesca Lo Schiavo
 Legends of the Fall – Art Direction: Lilly Kilvert; Set Decoration: Dorree Cooper
|-
| valign="top" |

 Legends of the Fall – John Toll Forrest Gump – Don Burgess
 The Shawshank Redemption – Roger Deakins
 Three Colours: Red – Piotr Sobociński
 Wyatt Earp – Owen Roizman
| valign="top" |

 Ed Wood – Ve Neill, Rick Baker and Yolanda Toussieng Forrest Gump – Daniel C. Striepeke, Hallie D'Amore and Judith A. Cory
 Mary Shelley's Frankenstein – Daniel Parker, Paul Engelen and Carol Hemming
|-
| valign="top" |

 The Adventures of Priscilla, Queen of the Desert – Lizzy Gardiner and Tim Chappel Bullets Over Broadway – Jeffrey Kurland
 Little Women – Colleen Atwood
 Maverick – April Ferry
 Queen Margot – Moidele Bickel
| valign="top" |

 Forrest Gump – Arthur Schmidt Hoop Dreams – Frederick Marx, Steve James and Bill Haugse
 Pulp Fiction – Sally Menke
 The Shawshank Redemption – Richard Francis-Bruce
 Speed – John Wright
|-
| valign="top" colspan="2" |

 Forrest Gump'' – Ken Ralston, George Murphy, Stephen Rosenbaum and Allen Hall
 The Mask – Scott Squires, Steve Spaz Williams, Tom Bertino and Jon Farhat
 True Lies – John Bruno, Thomas L. Fisher, Jacques Stroweis and Patrick McClung
|}

Academy Honorary Award
 Michelangelo Antonioni

Jean Hersholt Humanitarian Award
 Quincy Jones

Irving G. Thalberg Memorial Award
 Clint Eastwood

Multiple nominations and awards

The following 17 films received multiple nominations:

The following four films received multiple awards:

Presenters and performers
The following individuals, in order of appearance, presented awards or performed musical numbers.

Presenters

Performers

Ceremony information
Despite earning critical praise for the previous year's ceremony, actress and comedian Whoopi Goldberg announced that she would not host the ceremony for a second consecutive year saying, "I've had a great time, but I've done it." She added that her role in the upcoming movie Bogus would jeopardize her busy schedule. In addition, her Comic Relief co-host and veteran Oscar emcee Billy Crystal declined to host the show citing his commitment to his film Forget Paris which he directed, wrote, starred in, and produced. Producer Gil Cates hired actor, comedian, and Late Show host David Letterman as host of the 1995 ceremony. Cates explained his decision to hire the late-night talk show host saying, "He's punctual, he's well groomed, and he knows how to keep an audience awake." ABC entertainment president Ted Harbert also approved of the choice stating, "If Dave likes the experience, this could be a great answer for the show, just the way Johnny Carson did the show for many years."

As with previous ceremonies he produced, Cates centered the show on a theme. This year, he christened the show with the theme "Comedy and the Movies" commenting "This year, because of the earthquakes and floods and Bosnia and Rwanda, it was a (terrible) year, and therefore seemed a great year to celebrate what movies can really give us, which is an opportunity to go for two hours in the dark and laugh together. Even with television, it's not a community experience unless you have a very big family. So it's unique to movies and theater, and it's this very human thing." In tandem with the theme, the ceremony's opening number featured a montage produced by Chuck Workman featuring scenes of humorous moments from a variety of both comedic and non-comedic films projected on a large screen on the stage. During that segment, actors Tim Curry, Kathy Najimy, and Mara Wilson performed a modified version of the song "Make 'Em Laugh" from the film Singin' in the Rain, using blue screen technology to make it appear that they were jumping in and out of the montage on the screen. Several collections of film clips were shown throughout the broadcast highlighting various aspects of comedy such as troupes and dialogue.

Several other people were also involved with the production of the ceremony. Bill Conti served as musical director and conductor for the event. Production designer Roy Christopher designed a new stage for the ceremony which prominently featured a proscenium which was designed to resemble the iris of a camera. Moreover, Christopher commented that the iris motif was inspired by the iris shot prominently featured in several comedic films and shorts. Dancer Debbie Allen choreographed The Lion King musical number. Actors Alec Baldwin, Jack Lemmon, Steve Martin, and Rosie O'Donnell participated in a pre-taped comedic sketch lampooning auditions for a role in Cabin Boy, the film in which Letterman made his film acting debut.

Box office performance of nominees
At the time of the nominations announcement on February 14, the combined gross of the five Best Picture nominees at the US box office was $468 million, with an average of $93.6 million per film. Forrest Gump was the highest earner among the Best Picture nominees with $300 million in domestic box office receipts. The film was followed by Pulp Fiction ($76 million), Four Weddings and a Funeral ($52 million), Quiz Show ($21 million) and The Shawshank Redemption ($16 million).

Of the top 50 grossing movies of the year, 44 nominations went to 14 films on the list. Only Forrest Gump (2nd), The Client (12th), Pulp Fiction (14th), Four Weddings and a Funeral (20th), and Nell (41st) were nominated for directing, acting, screenwriting, or Best Picture. The other top 50 box office hits that earned nominations were The Lion King (1st), True Lies (3rd), Clear and Present Danger (6th), Speed (7th), The Mask (8th), Interview with the Vampire (10th), Maverick (11th), Legends of the Fall (27th) and Little Women (31st).

Critical reception
The show received a negative reception from most media publications. John J. O'Connor of The New York Times wrote, "Instead of keeping things moving smartly, Mr. Letterman stuck with his late-night shtick, too often leaving the show's pacing in shambles." He also added, "Within the show's first half-hour, with no strong hand at the helm, the audience simply sagged. Applause died long before most winners even reached the podium." Television critic John Carman of the San Francisco Chronicle commented, "Last night on ABC, no one got it. Hollywood's big event was wonderfully littered by technical errors, bad taste, low comedy and lower necklines." Moreover, he remarked, "Letterman, the rookie host, was off his game in his opening monologue. Maybe it was the big auditorium. Or a billion people in the television audience." Film critic Andrew Sarris of The New York Observer quipped, "Not only was he not witty or funny, he never knew when to let bad enough alone." He concluded, "As the evening dragged on, it became obvious that Mr. Letterman had no gift for ad-libbing through the few unpredictable opportunities in a 'live' event like the Oscars." People named the ceremony as one of the worst television broadcasts of 1995, summarizing it as follows: "a cranky skeptic visits the high temple of show business, mocks the gold-plated statuary and displays insufficient reverence for the gods. (Tom Hanks assisting with a stupid pet trick?!) We know who the winner wasn't."

Some media outlets received the broadcast more positively. Television critic Joyce Millman of The San Francisco Examiner noted, "In his first stint as host of the Oscar telecast, David Letterman did the impossible—he made something entertaining from what is traditionally the most boring three hours of TV this side of a test pattern." The Buffalo News columnist Alan Pergament praised Letterman's performance as host writing "David Letterman was a box full of chocolates on an Oscar night that was empty of much emotion until the expected Forrest Gump sweep in the final 15 minutes." He also added that despite a lack of surprises amongst the awards, the emotional and unexpected humorous moments provided depth and entertainment throughout the evening. Hal Boedeker of the Orlando Sentinel gave an average review of the ceremony but singled out Letterman noting that he "proved Monday night that he's among Oscar's Top 10 Hosts. He's definitely at the top of the list with Johnny Carson, Billy Crystal and Bob Hope."

Ratings and reception
The American telecast on ABC drew an average of 48.28 million people over its length, which was a 7% increase from the previous year's ceremony. An estimated 81 million total viewers watched all or part of the awards. The show also drew higher Nielsen ratings compared to the previous ceremony with 32.5% of households watching over a 53 share. It also drew a higher 18–49 demographic rating with a 21.7 rating among viewers in that demographic. It was the most watched Oscars telecast since the 55th ceremony held in 1983.

In July 1995, the ceremony presentation received six nominations at the 47th Primetime Emmys. Two months later, the ceremony won one of those nominations for Jeff Margolis's direction of the telecast.

In Memoriam
The annual In Memoriam'' tribute, presented by actress Sigourney Weaver, honored the following people:

 Raul Julia
 Fernando Rey
 Cameron Mitchell
 Barry Sullivan
 Giulietta Masina
 Peter Cushing
 Frank Wells – Executive
 Noah Beery Jr.
 Woody Strode
 Jessica Tandy
 Tom Ewell
 Lionel Stander
 Jule Styne – Composer
 Walter Lantz – Animator
 Arthur Krim – Executive
 Ferdinando Scarfiotti – Art Director
 Robert Bolt – Screenwriter
 Donald Pleasence
 Harry Saltzman – Producer
 Terence Young – Director
 Burt Lancaster
 Henry Mancini – Composer
 Martha Raye
 George Peppard
 Gilbert Roland
 Rossano Brazzi
 Cabell 'Cab' Calloway
 Mildred Natwick
 Macdonald Carey
 David Wayne

See also

 1st Screen Actors Guild Awards
 15th Golden Raspberry Awards
 37th Grammy Awards
 47th Primetime Emmy Awards
 48th British Academy Film Awards
 49th Tony Awards
 52nd Golden Globe Awards
 American Express Gold card dress of Lizzy Gardiner
 List of submissions to the 67th Academy Awards for Best Foreign Language Film

References

Bibliography

External links
Official websites
 Academy Awards Official website
 The Academy of Motion Picture Arts and Sciences Official website
 Oscar's Channel at YouTube (run by the Academy of Motion Picture Arts and Sciences)

Analysis
 1994 Academy Awards Winners and History Filmsite
 Academy Awards, USA: 1995 Internet Movie Database

Other resources
 

Academy Awards ceremonies
1994 film awards
1995 in Los Angeles
David Letterman
1995 in American cinema
March 1995 events in the United States
Academy
Television shows directed by Jeff Margolis